Mirko Ranieri (born 8 February 1992) is an Italian former professional footballer who played as a goalkeeper. He is now a product manager at Google.

Club career

Perugia
Born Assisi, Italy, Ranieri was brought up in Perugia where at school he won medals in football, athletics and chess. He began his career with Perugia, making 18 appearances for Perugia's under-18s, plus 12 games for the first team in friendlies.

Tottenham Hotspur
On 30 June 2008, English Premier League club Tottenham Hotspur announced they had signed Ranieri following his appearances for Italy at Under-16 level and he would join up the Academy group of players. Spurs' sporting director Damien Comolli described Ranieri as 6ft 2in and an excellent shot-stopper. His distribution and decision-making is improving all the time. He is a highly-intelligent individual and another very good young goalkeeper we have attracted to the club'.

Loan to Ipswich Town
On 9 November 2009, English Championship side Ipswich announced that Ranieri would join on loan until the end of the season as cover for regular youth goalkeeper Ian McLoughlin who was unavailable to play in the FA Youth Cup because of age restrictions for that competition, unfortunately Ranieri suffered a broken leg that ended his season early.

Loan to Basingstoke Town
On 18 February 2011, English Conference South side Basingstoke Town signed Ranieri on a one-month loan, during which time he made 2 appearances.

Loan to Viareggio
On 8 August 2011, Italian third division club Viareggio signed Ranieri on loan until the end of the season. Ranieri made a promising start to his time at Viareggio, establishing himself as the club's first choice goalkeeper.

International career
Ranieri played once in 2009 UEFA European Under-17 Football Championship qualification.

References

External links
 FIGC 
  Viareggio Profile

1992 births
Living people
Italian footballers
Tottenham Hotspur F.C. players
Ipswich Town F.C. players
Association football goalkeepers